Kronenberg is a surname. Notable people with the surname include:

 Samuel Eleazar Kronenberg (né Lejzor Hirszowicz Kronenberg; 1773–1826), a Polish-Jewish banker and industrialist
 Leopold Stanisław Kronenberg (1812–1878), a son of Samuel, a Polish banker and industrialist
 Stanisław Leopold Kronenberg (1846–1894), one of Leopold's sons, a Polish banker
 Władysław Edward Kronenberg (1848–1892), one of Leopold's sons, a Polish engineer, industrialist, and composer
 Baron Leopold Julian Kronenberg (1849–1937), one of Leopold's sons, a Polish banker
 Henryk Andrzej Kronenberg, a son of Samuel and brother of Leopold, a Polish doctor
 Anne Kronenberg, American political administrator and LGBT rights activist
 Henry Kronenberg (fl. 2000s), American physician and academic

See also
Cronenberg (surname)

German-language surnames
Jewish surnames
Yiddish-language surnames